Valery Nikolayevich Yemelyanov (1929–1999) was a Soviet-Russian Arabist and public figure, teacher of Arabic and Hebrew, and candidate of economic sciences. One of the founders of Russian neo-paganism, a representative of the "first wave" of the Russian neo-pagan movement, the creator of a pseudo-historical concept of the ancient civilization of the "Aryans-Veneti", and an author of antisemitic ideas. He was the founder and chairman of World Anti-Zionist and Anti-Masonic Front (VASAMF) "Pamyat" (the neo-pagan wing of the far-right Pamyat society) and author of the books Dezionization and Jewish Nazism and the Asiatic Mode of Production.

Biography 
Yemelyanov graduated from the Moscow State University Institute of Oriental Languages. He worked as an assistant to Nikita Khrushchev on Middle Eastern affairs.

In 1963, he was sued for plagiarism in his Ph.D. thesis. After Khrushchev's resignation in 1967, he defended his dissertation at the Higher Party School under the Central Committee of the CPSU, after which he taught political economy, Arabic, and Hebrew at the Maurice Thorez Institute of Foreign Languages, the Higher Party School, and other universities, and worked as a translator.

A good knowledge of the Arabic language and the peculiarities of the service allowed Yemelyanov to get extensive contacts in the Arab world, including the most senior officials. From these sources, he drew his understanding of "Zionism". As a lecturer at the Moscow City Party Committee in the early 1970s, Yemelyanov called for the "exposing" of the "Judeo-Masonic conspiracy."

Yemelyanov was the author of one of the first manifestos of Russian neo-paganism - an anonymous letter titled "Critical notes of a Russian person on the patriotic magazine Veche", published in 1973. After the appearance of the notes, the journal was liquidated in 1974, and its editor, V. Osipov, was arrested.

In the 1970s, Yemelyanov wrote the book Dezionization, first published in 1979 in Arabic in Syria in the Al-Baʽath newspaper at the behest of Syrian President Hafez al-Assad. At the same time, a photocopied copy of this book, allegedly issued by the Palestine Liberation Organization in Paris, was distributed in Moscow. Among the illustrations for this book were reproductions of paintings by Konstantin Vasilyev on the theme of the struggle of Russian heroes with evil forces and, above all, the painting "Ilya Muromets defeats the Christian plague," which has since become popular with neo-pagans.

The main idea of this voluminous and eclectic work is that the "true" history of humanity is a struggle between pagans and degenerate "Zionist" Jews hidden from the eyes of the layman. It also briefly retold the contents of the Book of Veles and the foundations of neo-paganism. The book outlines a version of the Judeo-Masonic conspiracy theory. According to Yemelyanov, the conspiracy of "Zionists" and "Masons" was created by Solomon in order to seize power over the whole world by the year 2000; in Solomon's Temple, they allegedly worshiped the devil and made human sacrifices. The book was translated and published in Israel and several European countries as an example of contemporary Soviet antisemitism.

The dissemination of the ideas described by Yemelyanov in Dezionization and at lectures in the Knowledge Society in the early 1970s caused an international protest, declared by the American Senator Jacob Javits to the Soviet Ambassador to the USA Anatoly Dobrynin in 1973, after which his lectures have been discontinued.

Yevgeny Yevseev acted as an expert on the book. Despite being one of the intellectual leaders of the Russian nationalists, he regarded the book as anti-Soviet and antisemitic.

In 1977, Yemelyanov sent a memorandum to the CPSU's Central Committee, claiming that all Soviet Jews were "Zionist agents." In this regard, he demanded the introduction of a mandatory course of "scientific anti-Zionism and anti-Masonry" in schools, universities, and the army, the creation of a scientific institute for the study of "Zionism" and "Masonry" under the Central Committee of the CPSU, etc.

In 1977–1978, Yemelyanov participated in the activities of the "anti-Zionist circle," based on which the participants planned to create the World Anti-Zionist and Anti-Masonic Front (VASAMF) "Pamyat". The circle was led by Yevgeny Yevseev, the nephew of the Secretary of the Central Committee of the CPSU, Boris Ponomarev. Later, in 1979–1980, following the example of the circle, the Society of Book Lovers under the Ministry of Aviation Industry was created, which in 1982 became the Society "Pamyat".

Semyon Reznik believes that Yemelyanov was the author of an anti-Semitic article in the Moskva magazine, published in 1979 under the pseudonym I. Bestuzhev. This article, in particular, argued that Judaism preaches hatred for non-Jews and advocates for killing the best of them.

Yemelyanov began to accuse a wide range of people of "Zionism", including the ruling elite, headed by the General Secretary of the Central Committee of the CPSU, Leonid Brezhnev. In 1980, he tried to distribute copies of Dezionization among members of the Politburo of the Central Committee of the CPSU and its secretariat. As a result of the proceedings in the Party Control Commission, Yemelyanov was expelled from the CPSU and suspended from work. The formal basis was a violation of party discipline - the publication of a book abroad. The Shorter Jewish Encyclopedia links the expulsion with Yemelyanov calling Leonid Brezhnev a "Zionist".

On April 10, 1980, Yemelyanov was arrested on charges of murdering and dismembering his wife with an axe, tried, declared insane with a diagnosis of schizophrenia, and placed in a Leningrad psychiatric hospital for six years. Aleksandr Dugin was a witness in this case. Yemelyanov was released in 1986.

After leaving the psychiatric hospital in 1986, Emelyanov joined the Pamyat Society of Dmitri Vasilyev. Yemelyanov's Dezionization and A. M. Ivanov's (Skuratov's) Christian Plague were "classical works" in society. Yemelyanov parted ways with Vasilyev on ideological grounds: Vasilyev believed that the "Zionists" were destroying Christianity in Russia, and Yemelyanov believed that Christianity was imposed on Russia by the "Zionists".

At the end of 1987, Yemelyanov founded the World Anti-Zionist and Anti-Masonic Front (VASAMF) "Pamyat".

From the end of 1989, Yemelyanov became an open adherent of neo-paganism. With Alexander Belov's Slavic-Gorits Wrestling Club, he created the Moscow Pagan Community, the first neo-pagan community in Moscow, and adopted the neo-pagan name Velemir. In 1990, Belov expelled Yemelyanov and his supporters, including Alexey Dobrovolsky (Dobroslav), from the community for political radicalism.

In 1991, Yemelyanov became one of the founders of the Slavonic Cathedral. In 1992, he declared himself "Chairman of the World Russian Government", but in the early 1990s, only a few dozen people who had their own militant sports club in Moscow were members of his organization. It is assumed that Arab countries financed their activities.

In the second half of the 1990s, Yemelyanov advocated restoring the monarchy in Russia, headed by the "Stalin dynasty," and proposed Stalin's grandson, retired colonel Yevgeny Dzhugashvili, as ruler. In the 1990s, Yemelyanov taught at the Academy of Armored Forces.

Toward the end of his life, Yemelyanov retired from the stage as a political figure. In 1997, together with a small number of followers, he joined the small Russian National Liberation Movement (RNOD) of A. M. Aratov and became the editor-in-chief of the Russkaya Pravda newspaper.

Ideas
In his letter "Critical Notes of a Russian on the Patriotic Magazine Veche" (1973), Yemelyanov accused the magazine of making concessions to "international Zionism," which is "more terrible than the fascist plague." He called Christianity and Islam "subsidiaries of Judaism" created to subjugate humanity to the Jews. He argued that "Christianity in general and Orthodoxy in particular ... were created just to erase everything original and national, to turn everyone who professes them into rootless cosmopolitans." The author urged Russians to return to the ancient faith in the Slavic pagan gods and "end Orthodoxy as a waiting room for Jewish slavery." The author declared the Bolsheviks the only force capable of saving the world from the "Zionist conspiracy."

In Dezionization (1970s), Yemelyanov wrote about the great Russian pre-Christian civilization that created a rich written language and culture. Like other neo-pagan authors, Valery Skurlatov and Vladimir Shcherbakov, he extensively referenced the Book of Veles, which supposedly preserved the remnants of the true Russian worldview, which constituted the "soul of the people." He called the ancient Aryans who came to India "Aryans-Veneti," who brought to Hindustan "our ideology, preserved at the basis of Hinduism and yoga." The "Aryans-Veneti" for some time also dominated the Eastern Mediterranean, giving it the name Palestine, which, according to Yemelyanov, means "Scorched Camp" (opalyonny stan). To portray the "Veneti," and not the Semites, as the creators of the alphabet, the author attributed the Phoenicians to them.

"Slavic-Russians," or "Veneti," populated all of continental Europe and Scandinavia right up to the lands of the Germans. "The only autochthons of Europe are the Veneti and the Baltic Aryans," while the Celts and Germans allegedly came from the depths of Asia. The "Veneti" constituted "the backbone of the Aryan language substratum" and were the main guardians of the "general Aryan" ideology. The purity of language and ideology was preserved only "in the vastness from Novgorod to the Black Sea," where the idea of "the trinity of three triune trinities" was preserved for the longest time: Prav-Yav-Nav, Svarog-Perun-Svetovid, Soul-Flesh-Power. A golden age reigned on this land - "the concept of evil did not exist," the Russians lived in harmony with nature, they did not know blind obedience to God, and they had neither sanctuaries nor priests. Yogi women carried the "occult power," allegedly generally characteristic of the "Aryans."

Yemelyanov portrayed the Jews as savages who migrated to "Aryan" Palestine and appropriated the "Aryan" cultural heritage. The very language of the Jews allegedly developed under a strong "Aryan" influence. The "wild Jews" managed to conquer the lands of the "glorious Aryans" not by military force and valor but thanks to the criminal actions of the Egyptian and Mesopotamian priests, who were afraid of the "great people of Ros or Rus", who lived in Asia Minor and Palestine:

Later (1994), this idea of Yemelyanov resulted in the formulation: "Jews are professional ancient criminals who have developed into a certain race." According to Yemelyanov, the world is doomed to the eternal struggle of two almost cosmic forces - nationalist patriots and "Talmudic Zionists".

From the moment the Jews appeared, the core of world history, according to Yemelyanov, was the mortal combat of the "Zionists" (Jews) and "Masons" against the rest of humanity, led by the "Aryans," in the struggle for world domination. The plan for this struggle was allegedly developed by the Jewish king Solomon. The idea of the sinister role of the biblical King Solomon goes back to the pamphlet of the Russian mystic Sergei Nilus, one of the first publishers of The Protocols of the Elders of Zion. Yemelyanov argued that Judaism required human sacrifice. Yemelyanov's goal was to expose the plans of the "Zionist-Masonic concern", which allegedly planned to create a world state by the year 2000. A powerful tool in the hands of "Zionism" is Christianity, which, according to Yemelyanov, was created by the Jews specifically to enslave other peoples. Yemelyanov's Jesus was simultaneously "an ordinary Jewish racist" and a "Mason", and Prince Vladimir Svyatoslavich was endowed with Jewish blood. Only the "Aryan" world, led by Russia, could repulse "Zionism."

VASAMF "Pamyat", headed by Yemelyanov, declared that he was acting on behalf of "the majority of the indigenous population of each of the countries of the world" and set the main goal of fighting against the threat of the domination of "Jewish Nazism (Zionism)". The Front's ultimate goal was to establish an "anti-Zionist and anti-Masonic dictatorship" in all countries, which would not encroach on the features of the existing state system. The Front announced the beginning of the "racial struggle," presenting it as a struggle for democracy, designed to save the world from the horrors "already experienced by the peoples of Russia and Palestine." The Front showed particular sympathy towards the Palestinians, calling them brothers in suffering from "genocide by the Jewish Nazis" and declaring its support for the Palestine Liberation Organization. Yemelyanov declared Islam his faithful ally in this struggle.

Influence
Yemelyanov is held in high esteem by some Russian neo-pagans, who consider him a "founding father". Many of Emelyanov's ideas became widespread in Slavic neo-paganism and the far-right environment: the theft by Jews of the great "Aryan" wisdom, the folk etymology of the word "Palestine", Jews as hybrids of criminals of different races, etc. The latter was perceived by such authors as Alexander Barkashov, Yuri Petukhov, Yu. M. Ivanov, and Vladimir Istarkhov. Some of Yemelyanov's ideas from Dezionization were directly borrowed by the writer Yuri Sergeev. The 1973 letter contained the main components of the ideology of the politicized wing of Russian neo-paganism: 
 antisemitism
 the idea of a "Zionist conspiracy"
 the rejection of Christianity as a "Jewish religion"
 a call to revive the worldview of Slavic-Russian paganism

Under the influence of Yemelyanov, several marker terms entered the fantastic and parascientific literature about the ancient Slavs, the mention of which indicates to those in the know that they are talking about a specific ideology but allows them to avoid accusations of antisemitism or racism: "Scorched camp" (Palestine); "Siyan Mountain" (Zion); "Rusa Salem" (Jerusalem); steppe ancestors who traveled throughout Eurasia in ancient times; Khazaria as a parasitic state (Khazar myth), etc.

Yemelyanov is the author of one of the main ideologically significant Russian neo-pagan myths about the Jewish-Khazar origin of Prince Vladimir Svyatoslavich, because of which he introduced Christianity, an instrument for the enslavement of the "Aryans" by Jews, which is described in Dezionization. Historian and religious scholar Roman Shizhensky characterizes this idea as one of the most "odious" neo-pagan historical myths. Shizhensky wrote that Yemelyanov's myth about Prince Vladimir in terms of the origin of the prince is based solely on an attempt to correlate and identify the names "Malk," "Malka," and "Dobrynya" with concepts (not even anthroponyms) that the author derives from the Hebrew language: "dabran" - a good speaker, talker, "malik" - king, ruler. Shizhensky notes that the neo-pagan myth about Vladimir contradicts scientific works on this issue and a combination of historical sources, in particular, testifying to the widespread distribution in Rus' and the Slavic origin of the anthroponym Malk.

Based on the decision of the Meshchansky District Court of Moscow dated December 3, 2008, Dezionization was included in the Russian Federal List of Extremist Materials under number 970.

References

Sources 
 
 
 
 
 
 
 
 

1929 births
1999 deaths
Russian nationalists
Soviet murderers
People acquitted by reason of insanity
Soviet economists
Expelled members of the Communist Party of the Soviet Union
Uxoricides
Russian conspiracy theorists
Far-right politics in Russia